Bitty Baby is an American Girl line of 15" infant baby dolls for children ages 3 and up. Bitty Baby's arms, legs, and head are made from vinyl.

A precursor to the line called Our New Baby was first released in 1990, which consisted of Caucasian (with blond hair), African-American, and Asian-American variants. The dolls were marketed as a way to get children to adjust to having a young baby in the house. The dolls were gender neutral, unlike the later Bitty Baby; it was expected that the doll could be a younger boy or girl.

The line saw another revamp in 2013, removing Bitty Bear from the package and replacing it with a plush "Wishing Star." Full picture books, written by Kirby Larson and illustrated by Sue Cornelison, were also released.

Collections
Bitty Baby portrays infants with different skin tone colors and eyes.  They have a wide range of accessories such as Pink Paisley Sleeper, Bitty Bear, Backpack, Tee, Bloomers, Dress, Bib, Hat and Shoes, Bottle, Blanket and Memory Book.

Bitty Twins
The Bitty Twins are a related line of dolls similar to the Bitty Babies. Originally released in 2003 as slightly older twins, the line was revamped in 2006, aging the dolls as preschoolers along with a redesigned collection. The Bitty Twins were discontinued in 2016 and replaced with WellieWishers, a line of 14.5" dolls marketed towards elementary school children.

References

American Girl
Doll brands